Avilla Bergin (born 1 August 1991) is an association football forward from Northern Ireland.

Club career 
Bergin was born in Dublin but grew up in Derry and attended Thornhill College. She played for a boys' team before joining Derry FC girls, where she came to the attention of Northern Ireland youth national team selectors. In 2010 she played for YMCA Ladies in the Northern Ireland Women's Premier League, but her appearances were curtailed by injury.

In 2010 Bergin attended Fordham University on a college soccer scholarship. She started ten of her 17 appearances for the Fordham Rams. Switching to Loughborough University, she played in the BUCS Football League, before joining FA Women's Premier League Southern Division club Tottenham Hotspur on her graduation in 2014.

After scoring 18 goals in 39 league appearances for Spurs, Bergin left for Charlton Athletic in June 2016. She reasoned that Charlton had better promotion prospects. After one season Bergin signed for Lewes, who had decided to pay their men's and women's teams the same. "Straight away it makes you feel valued," Bergin said.

References

External links 

 
 Avilla Bergin at Fordham Rams

1991 births
Living people
Women's association footballers from Northern Ireland
Northern Ireland women's international footballers
Women's association football forwards
Tottenham Hotspur F.C. Women players
Charlton Athletic W.F.C. players
Lewes F.C. Women players
Fordham Rams women's soccer players
Sportspeople from Derry (city)
Alumni of Loughborough University